A strength tester machine is a type of amusement personality tester machine, which upon receiving credit rates the subject's strength, according to how strongly the person presses levers, squeezes a grip  or punches a punching bag. In the past, strength testers could mainly be found in penny arcades and amusement parks, but they are now also common in pub-style locations as well as video arcades, bowling alleys, family entertainment centers and disco venues. Modern strength testing machines have become redemption games and use LCDs for a video feedback, while some such as Sega's K.O. Punch (1981) use a video game display for feedback.

In media

American Restoration features a restoration of a Punch-A-Bag strength tester machine from 1910 in the 6th episode  "Knockout" and of a strength tester that had stood on the Santa Monica Pier in the 17th episode "Grippin' Mad".
American Pickers features a 1920s Advance Machine Company electric shock strength tester in the 22nd episode "Laurel and Hardy".

Special forms
Electric shock strength testers evaluate how long someone can stand unperilous electric shocks. However, most machines in amusement parks today only utilize vibrations that feels somewhat like an electric shock to someone not expecting it.

Personality strength testers are a type of amusement personality tester machines that try to rate the strength of the subject's character. Such machines are for amusement purposes only and do not actually give a real result.

Gallery
The Musée Mécanique in San Francisco has a collection of over 300 mechanical games, including strength testers:

See also
 High striker, a strength tester utilizing a lever and a puck specifically
 Love tester machine
 Fortune teller machine

Notes

External links

 Mercury Athletic Scales Strength Tester coin-operated arcade machine game
 1969 Midway Golden Arm strength tester coin-operated arcade game
 Ingo Strength Tester United Distributing coin-operated arcade game

Commercial machines